Ivan Vladimirovich Sivozhelezov (Russian: Иван Сивожелезов; born 12 March 1985) is a Kazakhstani former footballer who is last known to have played as a goalkeeper for Makhtaaral.

Career

At the age of 21, Sivozhelezov made the most appearances during a season for his entire top flight career, for Atyrau.

Before the 2015 season, he signed for Alga in Kyrgyzstan after playing for Kazakhstani second division side Sunkar.

References

External links

 

Kazakhstani footballers
Expatriate footballers in Kyrgyzstan
Living people
1985 births
Association football goalkeepers
Kazakhstan Premier League players
FC Atyrau players
FC Vostok players
FC Okzhetpes players
FC Akzhayik players
FC Spartak Semey players
FC Sunkar players
FC Tobol players
FC Alga Bishkek players
FC Maktaaral players
Kazakhstan First Division players
Kyrgyz Premier League players
Kazakhstani expatriate sportspeople in Kyrgyzstan
People from Karaganda Region